Cacos may refer to:
 Cacos (C Standard Library)
 Cacos (military group)